University College (in full The College of the Great Hall of the University of Oxford, colloquially referred to as "Univ") is a constituent college of the University of Oxford in England. It has a claim to being the oldest college of the university, having been founded in 1249 by William of Durham.

As of 2018, the college had an estimated financial endowment of £132.7m.

The college is associated with a number of influential people, including Clement Attlee, Harold Wilson, Bill Clinton, Neil Gorsuch, Stephen Hawking, C. S. Lewis, V. S. Naipaul, Robert Reich, William Beveridge, Bob Hawke, Robert Cecil, and Percy Bysshe Shelley.

History 
A legend arose in the 14th century that the college was founded by King Alfred in 872. This explains why the college arms are those attributed to King Alfred, why the Visitor is always the reigning monarch, and why the college celebrated its millennium in 1872. Most agree that in reality the college was founded in 1249 by William of Durham. He bequeathed money to support ten or twelve masters of arts studying divinity, and a property which became known as Aula Universitatis (University Hall) was bought in 1253. This later date still allows the claim that Univ is the oldest of the Oxford colleges, although this is contested by Balliol College and Merton College. Univ was only open to fellows studying theology until the 16th century.

The college acquired four properties on its current site south of the High Street in 1332 and 1336 and built a quadrangle in the 15th century. As it grew in size and wealth, its medieval buildings were replaced with the current Main Quadrangle in the 17th century. Although the foundation stone was placed on 17 April 1634, the disruption of the English Civil War meant it was not completed until sometime in 1676. Radcliffe Quad followed more rapidly by 1719, and the library was built in 1861.

Like many of Oxford's colleges, University College accepted its first mixed-sex cohort in 1979, having previously been an institution for men only.

Buildings 

The main entrance to the college is on the High Street and its grounds are bounded by Merton Street and Magpie Lane. The college is divided by Logic Lane, which is owned by the college and runs through the centre. The western side of the college is occupied by the library, the hall, the chapel and the two quadrangles which house both student accommodation and college offices. The eastern side of the college is mainly devoted to student accommodation in rooms above the High Street shops, on Merton Street or in the separate Goodhart Building. This building is named after former master of the college, Arthur Lehman Goodhart.

A specially constructed building in the college, the Shelley Memorial, houses a statue by Edward Onslow Ford of the poet Percy Bysshe Shelley – a former member of the college, who was sent down for writing The Necessity of Atheism (1811), along with his friend T. J. Hogg. Shelley is depicted lying dead on the Italian seashore.

The college annexe on Staverton Road in North Oxford houses undergraduate students during their second year and some graduate students.

The college also owns the University College Boathouse (completed in 2007 and designed by Belsize architects) and a sports ground, which is located nearby on Abingdon Road.

Student life

Univ Alternative Prospectus 
The Alternative Prospectus is written and produced by current students for prospective applicants. The publication was awarded a HELOA Innovation and Best Practice Award in 2011. The Univ Alternative Prospectus offers student written advice and guidance to potential Oxford applicants. The award recognises the engagement of the college community, unique newspaper format, forward-thinking use of social media and the collaborative working between staff and students.

Grace 
University has the longest grace of any Oxford (and perhaps Cambridge) college. It is read before every Formal Hall, which is held on Tuesdays, Thursdays, and Sundays. The reading is performed by a Scholar of the college and whoever is sitting at the head of High Table (typically the Master, or the most senior Fellow at the table if the Master is not dining).

Original version 
SCHOLAR – Benedictus sit Deus in donis suis.RESPONSE – Et sanctus in omnibus operibus suis.SCHOLAR – Adiutorium nostrum in Nomine Domini.RESPONSE – Qui fecit coelum et terram.SCHOLAR – Sit Nomen Domini benedictum.RESPONSE – Ab hoc tempore usque in saecula.SCHOLAR – Domine Deus, Resurrectio et Vita credentium, Qui semper es laudandus tam in viventibus quam in defunctis, gratias Tibi agimus pro omnibus Fundatoribus caeterisque Benefactoribus nostris, quorum beneficiis hic ad pietatem et ad studia literarum alimur: Te rogantes ut nos, hisce Tuis donis ad Tuam gloriam recte utentes, una cum iis ad vitam immortalem perducamur. Per Jesum Christum Dominum nostrum.RESPONSE - Amen.SCHOLAR — Deus det vivis gratiam, defunctis requiem: Ecclesiae, Regi, Regnoque nostro, pacem et concordiam: et nobis peccatoribus vitam aeternam.RESPONSE - Amen.

English translation 
SCHOLAR — Let God be blessed in his gifts.RESPONSE — And holy in all his works.SCHOLAR — Our help is in the Name of the Lord.RESPONSE — Who has made heaven and earth.SCHOLAR —  May the Name of the Lord be blessed.RESPONSE — From this time for evermore.SCHOLAR — Lord God, the resurrection and the life of them that believe, who is always to be praised both among the living and among the dead, we give You thanks for all our founders and other benefactors, by whose gifts we are nourished here for piety and the study of learning; asking You that we, using these Your gifts rightly to Your glory, may be led together with them into eternal life. Through Jesus Christ our Lord.RESPONSE — Amen.SCHOLAR — May God grant to the living grace, and to the dead rest; to the Church, the King, and our realm, peace and concord; and to us sinners everlasting life.RESPONSE — Amen.

People associated with the college

Government and politics 

Many influential politicians are associated with the college, including the social reformer and author of the Beveridge Report William Beveridge (who was a master of University College) and two UK Prime Ministers: Clement Attlee and Harold Wilson (a Univ fellow). US President Bill Clinton (though he did not graduate) and Prime Minister of Australia, Bob Hawke were also students. Other heads of state and government to have attended Univ include Edgar Whitehead (Rhodesia), Kofi Abrefa Busia (Ghana), and Festus Mogae (Botswana). Nobel Peace Prize Laureate Robert Cecil studied law at the college, similarly U.S. Supreme Court Associate Justice Neil Gorsuch received a DPhil in law as a Marshall Scholar, while former NATO Supreme Allied Commander Bernard W. Rogers read Philosophy, Politics and Economics as a Rhodes Scholar, and former Court of Justice of the European Communities Judge Sir David Edward read Classics.

Literature and arts 

In the arts, people associated with the college include poet Percy Bysshe Shelley (expelled for writing The Necessity of Atheism), for whom there is a memorial in college; Poet Laureate Andrew Motion; author of the Narnia books C. S. Lewis; and a Nobel Prize for Literature winner, Sir V. S. Naipaul. One of the translators of the King James Bible, George Abbot, was a master of the college. The actors Michael York and Warren Mitchell attended Univ, as well as broadcaster Paul Gambaccini.

Science and innovation 

It was due to the college's lack of a mathematics fellow (this is no longer the case) that Stephen Hawking read a natural sciences degree and ended up specialising in physics. Other former students include John Radcliffe (physician), William Jones (philologist), and Edmund Cartwright (inventor). Rudolph A. Marcus, a Canadian-born chemist who received the 1992 Nobel Prize in Chemistry, received a Professorial Fellowship at Univ from 1975 to 1976. A perhaps more unusual alumnus is Prince Felix Yusupov, the assassin of Rasputin.

Univ had the highest proportion of old members offering financial support to the college of any Oxbridge college with 28% in 2007.

Other connections 

Although not members of University College, the scientists Robert Boyle (sometimes described as the "first modern chemist") and his assistant (Robert Hooke, architect, biologist, discoverer of cells) lived in Deep Hall (then owned by Christ Church and now the site of the Shelley Memorial). The former made a contribution to the completion of University College's current Hall in the mid-17th Century.

Samuel Johnson (author of A Dictionary of the English Language and a member of Pembroke College) was a frequent visitor to the Senior Common Room at University College during the 18th Century.

Publications 
The college produces a number of regular publications, especially for alumni.

University College Record 
The University College Record is the annual magazine sent to alumni of the college each autumn. The magazine provides college news on clubs and societies such as the University College Players and the Devas Club, as well as academic performance and prizes. News about and obituaries of former students are included at the end of each issue.

Editors have included Peter Bayley and Leslie Mitchell.

The Martlet 
The Martlet is a magazine for members and friends of the college, available in print and online.

Gallery

See also 
 University College Oxford Boat Club
 University College Players (college dramatic society)

References

External links 

 University College official website
 University College JCR website
 University College WCR website

 
1249 establishments in England
Colleges of the University of Oxford
Educational institutions established in the 13th century
Grade I listed buildings in Oxford
Grade I listed educational buildings
Organisations based in Oxford with royal patronage
Buildings and structures of the University of Oxford